The 2022 South Dakota State Jackrabbits football team represented the South Dakota State University as a member of the Missouri Valley Football Conference (MVFC) during the 2022 NCAA Division I FCS football season. The Jackrabbits were led by 26th-year head coach John Stiegelmeier. The team played their home games at Dana J. Dykhouse Stadium in Brookings, South Dakota. The team finished their regular season with 10 wins against a single loss, advanced through the FCS playoffs, and defeated North Dakota State in the FCS Championship Game, giving the Jackrabbits their first FCS championship.

Previous season

The Jackrabbits opened the 2021 season with four straight wins, highlighted by a 19-point road win over FBS foe Colorado State in the season opener. After losing two of three MVFC games to begin the conference slate – to No. 8 Southern Illinois and No. 20 Northern Iowa – SDSU bounced back by handing eventual National champion, No. 2 North Dakota State, their only loss of the season, 27–19. Entering the FCS Playoffs with an at-large bid and No. 11 ranking, the Jackrabbits defeated No. 14 UC Davis, No. 8 Sacramento State, and No. 6 Villanova to reach the semifinal round. They fell to No. 7 Montana State to finish with a record of 11–4 (5–3 MVFC) and a No. 4 ranking.

Schedule

Roster

Ranking movements

Game summaries

at Iowa

Source: Box Score

UC Davis

Source: Box Score

Butler

Source: Box Score

at No. 6 Missouri State

Source: Box Score

Western Illinois

Source: Box Score

South Dakota

Source: Box Score

at No. 1 North Dakota State

Source: Box Score

at No. 20 North Dakota

Source: Box Score

Indiana State

Source: Box Score

at Northern Iowa

Source: Box Score

Illinois State

Source: Box Score

No. 23 Delaware (second round)

Source: Box Score

No. 7 Holy Cross (quarterfinal)

Source: Box Score

No. 3 Montana State (semifinal)

Source: Box Score

vs. No. 4 North Dakota State (championship game)

Source: Box Score

References

South Dakota State
South Dakota State Jackrabbits football seasons
NCAA Division I Football Champions
Missouri Valley Football Conference champion seasons
South Dakota State
South Dakota State Jackrabbits football